David Tyler may refer to:

 David Tyler (producer) (born 1961), British television and radio comedy producer
 David Tyler (businessman) (born 1953), British business executive
 David Gardiner Tyler (1846–1927), U.S. Democratic Party politician